Judith Cowan (born in 1954) is a British artist who lives in London. She works in sculpture, installation, photography, and film.

Life and work 
From 1974 to 1977, Cowan studied sculpture at Sheffield Polytechnic and later at Chelsea School of Art and Design from 1977 to 1978. In 1978–79, she was awarded the Gulbenkian Rome Scholarship, British School at Rome.

Between 1980 and 2016, she taught in Fine Art at Goldsmith College, Chelsea School of Art and Design and Middlesex University amongst others.

Cowan has exhibited in solo shows at Camden Arts Centre (1993), Studio Stefania Miscetti (1995 and 2000), Kettle's Yard in Cambridge (1996), Museo Laboratorio di Arte Contemporanea in Rome (2005), Erica Ravenna Arte Contemporanea in Rome (2006), Finnegan’s Teeth project in London (2009) and traveled to Prague (2010). The films Angelica and The Palace of Raw Dreams were made in collaboration with the Antonio Pasqualino Museo in Palermo (2012 and 2013). Both films were exhibited at the Antonio Pasqualino Museo then Angelica travelled to the Sharjah Art Foundation (2014).

She received awards from the Henry Moore Foundation in 1998, 1996 and 1992; The Elephant Trust in 1993 and was a prize-winner at Rassegna Internazionale di Scultura Contemporanea, San Marino, Italy in 1979.

Her work is in the collections of The Ashmolean Museum, Oxford; Arts Council of Great Britain; the Hechinger Collection, US; Government Art Collection, London Borough of Tower Hamlets; Museo Laboratorio di Arte Contemporanea, Rome; Rugby Museum & Art Gallery  and the Walker Art Gallery, Liverpool.

Bibliography 

 Emily LaBarge, Paola Nicita, Rosario Perricone, Angelica, London, 2013
 Finnegan’s Teeth, RGAP, Sheffield, 2009 (Artist's book)
 S. Santacatterina, S. Lux, D. Scudero, Judith Cowan: The Capacity of Things: From Life, Luxflux, Rome, 2005

References

External links 

Art UK website 
Studio Stefania Miscetti 
Rugby Art Gallery and Museum 
Camden Arts Centre 
Arts Council Collection 

1954 births
Living people
20th-century British sculptors
21st-century British sculptors
20th-century British women artists
21st-century British women artists
Alumni of Chelsea College of Arts
British contemporary artists
British conceptual artists